Manchester United Football Club is an English football club based in Old Trafford, Greater Manchester. They were the first English club to participate in a European competition, entering the European Cup in 1956. Since then, the club has competed in every UEFA-organised competition, with the exception of the now-defunct Intertoto Cup and Conference League.

The competition in which Manchester United has had the most success is the European Cup (now known as the UEFA Champions League); they have won three European Cups, the first of which came in 1968; that victory made them the first English club to win the competition. The other two victories came in 1999 and 2008. The club has also won the Cup Winners' Cup in 1991, the Super Cup also in 1991, the Intercontinental Cup in 1999, and the Europa League in 2017.

After their Champions League wins in 1999 and 2008, Manchester United competed as a UEFA representative at the 2000 FIFA Club World Championship and the 2008 FIFA Club World Cup. They were knocked out of the 2000 tournament at the group stage, but went on to win the 2008 edition, becoming the first English side to do so.

History

Early years
Following their league title win the previous season, Manchester United first competed in European football competition in 1956–57. 1954–55 Football League winners Chelsea had been denied the opportunity to take part in the inaugural European Cup by The Football League's chairman Alan Hardaker, who feared that European football would damage the integrity of the English game. However, Matt Busby, the manager of Manchester United, was a forward-thinking man and was determined to have his team compete on the European stage. With the backing of The Football Association's chairman, Stanley Rous (who would later go on to become the president of FIFA), Manchester United were allowed to compete in the 1956–57 European Cup.

The club's first match in European competition was a European Cup preliminary round tie against Anderlecht at Parc Astrid in Brussels; Manchester United won the match 2–0 in front of 35,000 spectators. The return leg was played at Maine Road, the home of Manchester United's local rivals Manchester City, as United's stadium, Old Trafford, had not yet been fitted with the necessary floodlighting for evening games. The match finished as a 10–0 win for Manchester United, a result that still stands as the club's record win in all competitions. A long run in the European Cup followed, including wins over Borussia Dortmund and Athletic Bilbao and culminating with a semi-final tie against Real Madrid. The first leg took United to the Santiago Bernabéu Stadium, where they were defeated 3–1 in front of a record away crowd of 135,000 spectators. However, they were only able to draw 2–2 in the second leg back at Old Trafford, and the club's first European season came to an end as Real Madrid went on to record the second of their five consecutive European Cup titles.

Munich

United won the league title again that season, and were therefore eligible to compete in the European Cup for the second consecutive year. After dispatching Shamrock Rovers 9–2 on aggregate in the preliminary round, United were paired with Dukla Prague for the first round. After the second leg in Prague, the team was scheduled to fly back to Manchester the following day, but fog over Manchester prevented this and they were forced to make hasty arrangements to travel back via ferry from the Hook of Holland to Harwich and then by train up to Manchester. This long-winded journey took its toll on the players, who were only able to manage a 1–1 away draw against Birmingham City two days later.

Eager to avoid such a scenario again, the club's management chartered a plane for the quarter-final second leg away to Red Star Belgrade. Following a 2–1 win in the first leg at Old Trafford, a 3–3 draw in Belgrade was enough to secure passage to the semi-finals. On the return flight to Manchester, British European Airways Flight 609 stopped over in a snow-covered Munich for refuelling. Once the refuelling was complete, the pilot was given clearance to take off, only to be halted by a fault with the plane's engine. A second attempt was made a few seconds later, but the same fault kept the plane grounded. Half an hour later, after inspection by the airport's engineers, the plane was given clearance for another take-off attempt. The suggested solution was to have the plane accelerate more slowly, but this meant that the take-off velocity would not be reached until the plane was even further down the runway. Once the plane reached 117 knots – the speed at which it was no longer safe to abort the take-off – the pilot would have expected the plane's velocity to continue to increase; however, there was a sudden drop in velocity and the plane was unable to take off before the end of the runway. It skidded off the end of the runway, through a wire fence and across a road before crashing into a house.

The impact of the crash and the subsequent explosion of fuel killed 21 of the 44 people on board instantly, and another two died in hospital a few days later. Eight of those who died were Manchester United players, among them Duncan Edwards, Roger Byrne and Tommy Taylor, while club secretary Walter Crickmer, trainer Tom Curry and coach Bert Whalley were also killed. Matt Busby was also severely injured, but he made a full recovery after two months in hospital. With eight of the club's first team having been killed in the accident, and several more still recuperating, a threadbare side took to the field for the semi-final matches against Milan. A 2–1 win at Old Trafford in the first leg gave the team hope of a place in the final, but a 4–0 defeat back at the San Siro put paid to those dreams. In honour of those who died, UEFA offered United a berth in the 1958–59 European Cup, drawing them against BSC Young Boys in the preliminary round, but the Football League denied United entry to the competition as they had not won the Football League the previous season after their league campaign crumbled in the aftermath of the disaster. The games against Young Boys went ahead as friendlies.

Return to Europe
Victory in the 1962–63 FA Cup meant that United returned to European competition after a five-year absence for the 1963–64 Cup Winners' Cup. After sweeping aside Willem II of the Netherlands and the defending champions, England's Tottenham Hotspur, United were drawn against Sporting CP in the quarter-finals. A 4–1 home win in the first leg meant that United needed to avoid defeat by more than three goals at Estádio José Alvalade to progress to the semi-finals; however, the team succumbed to their heaviest defeat in European competition to date, losing 5–0 on the night and 6–4 on aggregate.

A second-place finish in the league in 1963–64 meant that United qualified for the Inter-Cities Fairs Cup in 1964–65. They reached the semi-finals, knocking out Djurgården, Borussia Dortmund, Everton and Strasbourg before losing 2–1 to Ferencváros in a play-off after a 3–3 aggregate draw over two legs.

Back in the European Cup
The following season saw United return to the European Cup for the first time since Munich after they had beaten Leeds United to top spot in the Football League on goal average. After seeing off Finland's HJK Helsinki and Vorwärts Berlin of East Germany in the first two rounds, Manchester United were drawn against four-time finalists, two-time winners and the previous season's runners-up, Benfica. Benfica's most famous player, the Portuguese international Eusébio, had just been named the European Footballer of the Year and his team went into the tie as favourites. Despite this tag, United ran out 3–2 winners in the first leg at Old Trafford, before beating the Lisbon side 5–1 back at the Estádio da Luz, in what is considered to be the greatest match of George Best's career. The result set up a semi-final tie with Partizan, a tie that would take United back to Belgrade for the first time since the tragedy in Munich. Best had injured his knee in an FA Cup Sixth Round match against Preston North End a couple of weeks before, and although he played in the first leg against Partizan, he was not fully fit and United struggled, losing 2–0 at the JNA Stadium. A goal from Nobby Stiles secured a 1–0 win in the second leg back at Old Trafford, but it was not enough and Matt Busby, believing that his dream of winning the European Cup was over, considered retirement; however, he resolved to win another league title and have one last shot at Europe's biggest prize.

First European title
Manchester United won the 1966–67 Football League title by four points over Nottingham Forest with a game to spare; this secured their second European Cup appearance in three seasons for 1967–68. After overcoming the Maltese champions, Hibernians, in the first round, United were handed yet another trip to Yugoslavia, this time to take on FK Sarajevo. The Red Devils faced a long journey to Sarajevo for the first leg, and they were held to a 0–0 draw in a very physical match. The second leg was equally robust, but United took control of the tie with goals from John Aston and George Best. Sarajevo were only able to pull back one goal and United went through to the quarter-finals, where they were drawn against Polish side Górnik Zabrze. United won the first leg at Old Trafford 2–0; an own goal from Stefan Florenski put them 1–0 up after an hour, and Brian Kidd doubled their lead in the final minute. The Poles had come to be considered one of the better sides in the last eight, and they were able to come away with a 1–0 win in the second leg, but it was not enough to prevent United from progressing to a semi-final tie with Real Madrid. United's 1–0 win in the first leg at Old Trafford was all that separated the sides after a 3–3 draw at the Bernabéu, setting up a meeting with Benfica in the final at Wembley Stadium. Best was again on the scoresheet, along with two goals from Charlton and one from Kidd on his 19th birthday, as United beat the Portuguese champions 4–1 after extra time to claim their first European trophy.

United reached the semi-finals of the European Cup as holders in the 1968–69 season, but lost to Milan. They would not compete in Europe for another seven years.

European comeback
Following the retirement of Sir Matt Busby as manager at the end of the 1968–69 season, United entered a barren period that culminated in relegation to the Second Division in 1974. Promotion was achieved at the first attempt under the management of Tommy Docherty, who had taken over in December 1972, and in that first season back in the top flight, United finished third in the league to qualify for the UEFA Cup.

Although United did qualify for the European Cup Winners' Cup as FA Cup winners in 1977 and for the UEFA Cup in 1980 and 1982 with top-five finishes, they failed to make an impact on European competitions until the 1983–84 season, when they qualified for the European Cup Winners' Cup as FA Cup winners under Ron Atkinson. The United squad of this era was arguably the finest of the post-Busby era, containing star players including Ray Wilkins, Bryan Robson, Frank Stapleton and teenage forward Norman Whiteside. United achieved a famous victory over Barcelona in the quarter-finals of the 1983–84 European Cup Winners' Cup, winning the second leg 3–0 at Old Trafford after being beaten 2–0 in Spain in the first leg, made all the more impressive by the fact that Barcelona's team contained Diego Maradona, rated by many as the best footballer in the world at the time.

United reached the quarter-finals of the UEFA Cup in 1984–85, but this would be their last contribution to European football for half a decade; the subsequent Heysel Stadium disaster at the European Cup final, in which rioting by Liverpool fans resulted in the death of 39 spectators and led to a ban on all English clubs in European competitions which would not be lifted in 1990. This resulted in United missing out on qualification for the European Cup Winners' Cup in 1985, and the UEFA Cup in 1986 and 1988. During this exile from Europe, United replaced Ron Atkinson with Alex Ferguson as their manager, and he remained in charge more than a quarter of a century later.

1990s, 2000s and early 2010s: rise to the European elite and Champions League titles

When the ban on English clubs in European competitions was lifted for the 1990–91 season, United were England's representatives in the European Cup Winners' Cup, as FA Cup winners, and they marked their return to Europe by winning the competition, with a 2–1 win over Barcelona (by now without Maradona) in the final, in which Mark Hughes scored twice. Their defence of the trophy in the 1991–92 season was short-lived, ending at the hands of Atlético Madrid in the second round, and they lost at the first hurdle in the 1992–93 UEFA Cup. League title glory in 1993 saw United enter the European Cup (now branded the Champions League) for the first time in 25 years, but in spite of their excellent domestic form during this era, they failed to make much of an impact in European competitions until the 1996–97 season, when they reached the semi-finals of the Champions League and were beaten by Borussia Dortmund. This campaign in Europe also saw them suffer their first home defeat in a European competition, 40 years after first competing on the continent, losing 1–0 to Turkish side Fenerbahçe in the group stage.

They finally ended a 31-year wait for a second European Cup in 1999 when stoppage-time goals from Teddy Sheringham and Ole Gunnar Solskjær gave them a 2–1 win over Bayern Munich in the final in Barcelona. In 2003–04, United were beaten by Porto in the last 16 of the Champions League, ending a seven-year run of quarter-final appearances in the competitions, which also included one run to the final and a further two to the semi-finals.

After three short-lived Champions League campaigns, United made an impact on the competition in the 2006–07 season. After going down 2–1 in Italy to Roma in the quarter-final first leg, they triumphed 7–1 in the second leg to reach the semi-finals for the first time in five years. They took a 3–2 lead against Milan in the first leg, only for their hopes of an all-English final with Liverpool to be ended by a 3–0 second leg defeat. A year later, however, they won the trophy for the third time, beating fellow English side Chelsea on penalties in Moscow after a 1–1 draw in the first all-English European Cup final.

United reached a further two European Cup finals in the next three years, but lost to Barcelona on both occasions: first in the 2009 final in Rome, and then in the 2011 final at the new Wembley Stadium in London. Poor performances in the 2011–12 UEFA Champions League group stage saw United finish third, giving them another chance in Europe via the UEFA Europa League. This was the first time United entered the tournament since its rebrand from the UEFA Cup in 2009, in which they last competed in 1995–96. They were eventually knocked out in the round of 16, losing 5–3 on aggregate to Athletic Club.

2010s and 20s: Europa League Success
After finishing seventh in the Premier League in 2013–14 under David Moyes, United missed out on European football in 2014–15 for the first time in 25 years, but returned to European action the following season after Moyes' replacement Louis van Gaal guided the club to fourth in the league and a place in the Champions League play-off round. It was the first time that Manchester United had played in the qualifying phase of the Champions League since beating Hungarian side Debrecen in the 2005–06 competition.

By virtue of winning the 2015–16 FA Cup (compounded by a fifth-place finish in the Premier League that season), United started their European campaign for 2016–17 in the Europa League for the first time since 1995–96. United won the tournament after defeating AFC Ajax 2–0 in the final, giving them their first win of the competition and becoming the fifth club to win all three of UEFA's major titles. Underperformance in the league has led the club to further Europa League participations: in 2019–20 United lost to Sevilla in the semi-final, and in 2020–21 they lost to Villarreal in the final. Since the club last won the league title in 2012–13, they have not advanced past the quarter-finals stage of the Champions League. In the 2021–22 Champions League, the Reds topped their group but were knocked out in the round of 16 by Atlético Madrid. Since the club last won the league title in 2012–13, they have not advanced past the quarter-finals stage of the Champions League (having reached it only twice). As a result of the six-place finish in the 2021–22 Premier League, Manchester United again qualified for the Europa League.

Matches

Overall record

By competition

By country

By club

Honours

European
European Cup / UEFA Champions League:
Winners (3): 1967–68, 1998–99, 2007–08
Runners-up (2): 2008–09, 2010–11
UEFA Europa League:
Winners (1): 2016–17
Runners-up (1): 2020–21
UEFA Cup Winners' Cup:
Winners (1): 1990–91
UEFA Super Cup:
Winners (1) 1991
Runners-up (3): 1999, 2008, 2017

Worldwide
Intercontinental Cup:
Winners (1): 1999
Runners-up (1): 1968
FIFA Club World Cup:
Winners (1): 2008

Notes

References

External links
StretfordEnd.co.uk

Europe
Manchester United